Ultium is an electric vehicle battery and motor architecture developed by General Motors. It is planned to be deployed for battery electric vehicles from General Motors portfolio brands along with vehicles from Honda and Acura.

Ultium is characterized by a modular layout, using an Ultium battery to supply power to one or two Ultium Drive unit(s) using a common set of power electronics (charging, battery management system, and inverter). The high-voltage battery is composed of pouch cells that can be stacked horizontally or vertically, depending on the form factor appropriate for each vehicle, generally carried between the axles and under the floor. The traction motor(s), reduction gear, and power electronics are combined into a single Ultium Drive unit that drives the front, rear, or both axles. Three electric motor designs, sharing a common stator, are used across all planned vehicles/types. Ultium is used by GM's BEV3 and BT1 platforms.

History 
General Motors revealed the Ultium battery and platform technologies during a week-long March 2020 event held at the General Motors Technical Center in Warren, Michigan; GM chairwoman and CEO Mary Barra called it "a multi-brand, multi-segment EV strategy with economies of scale that rival our full-size truck business with much less complexity and even more flexibility". The Ultium Drive branding was applied six months later in September 2020, referring to electric vehicle drivetrain components exclusive of the batteries, such as the traction motors and power electronics.

GM announced in June 2021 it would collaborate with Wabtec to provide Ultium battery modules for zero-emission heavy-haul locomotives, including the FLXDrive.

In 2022, the US Army selected GM Defense to demonstrate an electric military vehicle, using the GMC Hummer EV pickup. In September, GM Defense was chosen to build a heavy-duty pack to power electric military vehicles.

Design

Ultium Drive 
Ultium vehicles are powered by a family of five interchangeable drive units and three electric traction motors, known collectively as "Ultium Drive".

Planned motors include:

 A  front-drive permanent magnet motor
 A  front-drive or rear-drive permanent magnet motor 
 A  all-wheel drive assist induction motor

The motors are suitable for front-wheel drive, rear-wheel drive and all-wheel drive configurations. For example, the GMC Hummer EV prototype shown in March 2020 has full-time all-wheel drive and is equipped with three  motors, one driving the front axle and the other two driving the rear wheels. The two drive units provide reduction ratios of 13.3:1 and 10.5:1 for the front and rear wheels, respectively. The three traction motor types are oil-cooled and share a common stator design.

The drive units are single-speed reduction gearboxes with integrated drivetrain electronic control modules that accept one or more traction motors and provide power to the wheels. These modules, sometimes called power electronics, include the traction power inverter, onboard charging module, and accessory power module; drive unit integration of these modules results in a combined mass that is half that of the equivalent components of the Chevrolet Bolt EV.

Ultium battery 
Ultium battery cells feature nickel-cobalt-manganese-aluminum (NCMA) chemistry, and will be manufactured by Ultium Cells LLC, a joint-venture of GM and LG Energy Solution. Battery materials will be supplied by LG Chem and POSCO Chemical (cathode active materials) and Livent (lithium hydroxide).

Specifications
Its gravimetric power density is 952 W10s/kg. Pouches may be oriented horizontally or vertically, affording packaging flexibility.

Ultium features a wireless battery management system (wBMS), the first such architecture from any automaker. The wBMS was developed in partnership with Analog Devices and contributes to reduced battery costs, as it requires 90% less wiring and reduces volume by 15%.

In late January 2023, it was reported that GM was considering switching to batteries in a cylindrical cell format. This move would reduce volumetric energy density, but could reduce production time and costs.

Assembly
24 cells are combined into a module, and from 6 to 24 modules (144 to 576 cells) are combined into a pack with a capacity ranging from 50 to 200 kWh. GM claims that they can survive repeated DC fast charging.

For the GMC Hummer EV, two 12-module battery packs are wired in series, creating two 400 V, 100 kWh batteries; these batteries are stacked and wired in parallel, yielding 200 kWh storage capacity. The stacks can be temporarily switched to be wired in series, allowing for DC fast charging at up to 800 V and 350 kW.

Cost 
With Ultium, GM estimates the cost will be reduced by 90% to approximately $100/kWh. This also is a significant reduction compared to the 60 kWh battery in the Chevrolet Bolt EV, which was priced at approximately $262/kWh in 2017, although GM had negotiated a significantly lower price of $145/kWh from its supplier, LG Chem. Part of the cost reduction results from the novel chemistry, which has 70% less cobalt than the Bolt's battery. In addition, labor costs are reduced because the wiring in each battery pack has been reduced by 88% compared to the Bolt due to the wireless battery management system.

Production 
Four production facilities were planned as of 2021:

 Ultium Cells LLC – Lordstown, Ohio, USA (Opened Sept. 2022, 35GWh capacity)
 Ultium Cells LLC – Spring Hill, Tennessee, USA (Opening late 2023, 50GWh capacity)
 Ultium Cells LLC – Lansing, Michigan, USA (Opening late-2024, 50GWh capacity)
 Unknown location, unknown opening date. Possibly New Carlisle, Indiana, USA.

GM also opened an Ultium Center factory in October 2021 in Shanghai, which produces batteries and traction motors for EVs produced and sold in China. In 2022, the United States Department of Energy (DOE) provided a $2.5 billion loan to Ultium Cells to assist in the construction of the three announced plants in the US. It is the first loan from DOE to a battery cell producer under the DOE's Advanced Technology Vehicles Manufacturing program.

Vehicles using Ultium 
Current
 GMC Hummer EV (2021–present)
 BrightDrop Zevo 600 (2021–present)
 Cadillac Lyriq (2022–present)
Planned
 BrightDrop Zevo 400 (2023)
 Buick Electra E5 (2023)
 Buick Electra E4
 Chevrolet Silverado EV (2023)
 Chevrolet Equinox EV (2023)
 Chevrolet Blazer EV (2023)
 Cadillac Celestiq (late 2023)
 Honda Prologue (2024)
 Acura ZDX (2024)
 GMC Sierra EV (2024)

See also 
 General Motors BEV3 platform

References 

Electric vehicle platforms
General Motors platforms